Lampsilis cariosa, the yellow lampmussel, is a species of freshwater mussel, an aquatic bivalve mollusk in the family Unionidae, the river mussels.

Its natural habitat is rivers.

Distribution and conservation status 
This species is found in Canada and the United States.

It lives in New Brunswick and in Nova Scotia in Canada, where the Committee on the Status of Endangered Wildlife in Canada (COSEWIC) has listed it as a species of special concern. The Canadian Species at Risk Act listed it in the List of Wildlife Species at Risk as being a species of special concern in Canada.

References

cariosa
Bivalves described in 1817
Taxonomy articles created by Polbot